Weickertshöhe is a mountain of Bavaria, Germany.

Hills of Bavaria
Hills of the Spessart